Fanny Marchiò (1904–1980) was an Italian stage, film and television actress. She was born in Corfu to an Italian family, her parents were both actors.

She was married to Renato Navarrini.

Selected filmography
 The Lady in White (1938)
 For Men Only (1938)
 In High Places (1943)
 Variety Lights (1950)
 Without a Flag (1951)
 The White Sheik (1952)

References

Bibliography 
 Goble, Alan. The Complete Index to Literary Sources in Film. Walter de Gruyter, 1999.

External links 
 

1904 births
1980 deaths
Italian film actresses
Italian television actresses
Actors from Corfu
Greek emigrants to Italy